Gibbovalva is a genus of moths in the family Gracillariidae.

Species
Gibbovalva civica (Meyrick, 1914)
Gibbovalva clavata Bai, 2016
Gibbovalva kobusi Kumata & Kuroko, 1988
Gibbovalva magnoliae Kumata & Kuroko, 1988
Gibbovalva quadrifasciata (Stainton, 1862)
Gibbovalva singularis Bai & Li, 2008 
Gibbovalva tricuneatella (Meyrick, 1880)
Gibbovalva urbana (Meyrick, 1908)

External links
Global Taxonomic Database of Gracillariidae (Lepidoptera)

Acrocercopinae
Gracillarioidea genera